Mnesarchella is a genus of "New Zealand  primitive moths" in the family Mnesarchaeidae. This genus is endemic to New Zealand.

Taxonomy
This genus was first described by George William Gibbs in 2019.

Species
Mnesarchella acuta (Philpott, 2019)
Mnesarchella dugdalei Gibbs, 2019
Mnesarchella falcata Gibbs, 2019
Mnesarchella fusilella (Walker, 1864)
Mnesarchella hamadelpha (Meyrick, 1888)
Mnesarchella loxoscia (Meyrick, 1888)
Mnesarchella ngahuru Gibbs, 2019
Mnesarchella philpotti Gibbs, 2019 
Mnesarchella stellae Gibbs, 2019 
Mnesarchella vulcanica Gibbs, 2019

References

Moths of New Zealand
Mnesarchaeoidea
Endemic fauna of New Zealand
Moth genera
Taxa named by George William Gibbs
Endemic moths of New Zealand